The 2015 Asian Youth Netball Championship was the 9th edition of the tournament. The tournament was being played in Macpherson Stadium at Mong Kok, Hong Kong from 14 December to 20 December with twelve Asian national netball teams.

Sri Lanka defeated Malaysia 53–48 in the final to win the championship.

Teams

Preliminary round
All times are in Hong Kong Standard Time (UTC+08:00).

Key:

Group A1

Group B1

Group C1

Group D1

Second round
All times are in Hong Kong Standard Time (UTC+08:00).

Trophy

Plate

Bowl

Final and playoffs

Seventh and eighth place

Fifth and sixth place

Third and fourth place

Final

References

Asian Netball Championship
2015 in Hong Kong sport
Asian
International netball competitions hosted by Hong Kong